Leigh Delamere services is a motorway service station on the M4 motorway situated one mile west of Junction 17, between Bristol and Swindon (close to Chippenham and Malmesbury). It takes its name from the adjoining village of Leigh Delamere. It is one of Europe's largest service stations. 

The service area is owned by Moto Hospitality.

History
It was planned to open in January or February 1972, run by Esso Tavernas; other sites of Esso were Birch Services, Washington services, Woolley Edge services, Southwaite Services. The site cost £650,000.

Opening
It opened on Monday 3 February 1972, with the largest petrol station in the UK.

Buildings
It served petrol only for the first 8 weeks

Food
At opening it had 188 restaurant seats and 60 cafeteria seats.

In popular culture 
The station is mentioned in The Eyre Affair by Jasper Fforde and is supposedly named after the mother of an associate of the main villain.  It features several times in BBC's Gavin & Stacey, although scenes purportedly at Leigh Delamere were filmed at Cardiff Gate services in Wales.

References

External links 
 Motorway Services Online - Leigh Delamere

M4 motorway service stations
Moto motorway service stations
Buildings and structures in Wiltshire